Central West End is a St. Louis MetroLink station. It is located in the Central West End neighborhood just southeast of the intersection of Euclid Avenue and Children's Place. This station serves the Washington University Medical Center, Barnes-Jewish Hospital, St. Louis Children's Hospital, and St. Louis University High School (by crossing the pedestrian bridge that spans the highway). Central West End is also a major MetroBus transfer and is the most traveled station in the MetroLink system.

In 2000, Metro's Arts in Transit program commissioned the work Ohne Titel by Olafur Eliasson for installation in the tunnel near the station. The 60 aluminum lamp housings with colored acrylic lenses and fluorescent lamps work together to create dabs of glowing colors that span the tunnel wall in an evenly spaced spectrum.

In April of 2021, Metro, in partnership with the Washington University School of Medicine and BJC HealthCare, completed a major upgrade to the station. Included in the upgrade:

 A new glass canopy covering 60% of the platform
 A new glass elevator outside of the path of pedestrian travel
 A new WUSM welcome center at the Euclid level entrance and exit
 Widening the main stairwell from 6' to 10'
 Enhanced lighting and security fencing/gates
 Aesthetic upgrades to match adjacent hospital buildings

Station layout
The station can be accessed by stairs or an elevator at the west end of the platform near Euclid Avenue and Children's Place. The Central West End MetroBus Center is located on the ground level of the Barnes-Jewish staff parking garage and is accessible via lighted walkway from the east end of the platform.

References

External links
 St. Louis Metro

MetroLink stations in St. Louis
Railway stations in the United States opened in 1993
Red Line (St. Louis MetroLink)
Blue Line (St. Louis MetroLink)
Central West End, St. Louis